COO or coo may refer to:

Business
 Certificate of origin, used in international trade
 Chief operating officer or chief operations officer, high-ranking corporate official
 Concept of operations, used in Systems Engineering Management Process
 Country of origin, a representative to the country or countries of manufacture, production, design, or brand origin where an article or product comes from

Communication
 Cell of origin (telecommunications)
 "Coo", the call of pigeons and doves

People
 Coo Coo Cal (Calvin Bellamy, born 1970), American rapper
 Coo Coo Marlin (1932–2005), racing driver

Science
 Carboxylate, type of anion
 Cobalt(II) oxide, chemical with formula of CoO

Places
 Coo, the former Italian name for the Dodecanese island Kos, now in Greece, off the coast of Turkey
 Calgary Olympic Oval, a Canadian ice rink
 COO, the IATA code for Cadjehoun Airport in Cotonou, Benin
 COO, the National Rail code for Cookham railway station in the county of Berkshire, UK

Other uses
 Daihatsu Coo, a 2006–2012 Japanese subcompact hatchback
 Summer Days with Coo, a 2007 Japanese animated film
 The Cooper Companies, a medical device company which trades on the NYSE as COO

See also